Worldwide is the seventh full-length album released by Audio Adrenaline in 2003.

The album won 2004 Grammy Award for Best Rock Gospel Album.

Critical reception

The album was well received by critics. Steve Losey, of AllMusic, gave the album 4 stars out of 5 while praising both Mark Stuart's vocals and Tyler Burkum's playing. John DiBiase, of Jesus Freak Hideout, gave the album 3.5 stars out of 5, writing that the album "offers some of the most memorable moments for the band". Despite criticizing the track "Start a Fire" for contrasting too much with the rest of the album, DiBiase closes his review by saying "Worldwide is a great album to start off a promising year for releases in CCM and will easily be one of the best projects of 2003".

Commercial performance

The album peaked at No. 116 on Billboard 200.

Music videos

Two live music videos were released for the songs "Church Punks" and "Leaving Ninety-Nine".

Track listing

Note
 appears on Adios: The Greatest Hits

Personnel

 Mark Stuart - lead vocals
 Tyler Burkum - lead vocals, guitars
 Will McGinniss - bass, vocals
 Ben Cissell - drums, vocals

References

2003 albums
Audio Adrenaline albums
ForeFront Records albums
Grammy Award for Best Rock Gospel Album